The rota is one of the symbols used by the pope to authenticate documents such as papal bulls. It is a cross inscribed in two concentric circles. Pope Leo IX was the first pope to use it.

The four inner quadrants contain: "Petrus", "Paulus", the pope's name, and the pope's ordinal number. The pope's autograph or motto is sometimes inscribed between the concentric circles.

A rota was also used by monarchs for the authentication of documents and diplomas.

See also

 Signum manus
 Tughra

Notes

References

External links

Examples of the rota
Examples of the rota

Documents of the Catholic Church
Seals (insignia)